The following list includes notable people who were born or have lived in East St. Louis, Illinois. For a similar list organized alphabetically by last name, see the category page People from East St. Louis, Illinois.

Authors and academics

Business, science and engineering

Media and arts

Bands

Politics

Sports

Baseball

Basketball

Football

Tennis

Track and field

References

East St. Louis
East Saint Louis